Layvin Marc Kurzawa (born 4 September 1992) is a French professional footballer who plays as a left-back for Premier League club Fulham, on loan from Ligue 1 club Paris Saint-Germain.

Kurzawa began his career at Monaco in 2010, and played 96 official games for the team, scoring eight goals. In 2015, he transferred to Paris Saint-Germain for €23 million. With Paris, Kurzawa has won 16 domestic trophies, including four Ligue 1 titles. Kurzawa made his senior international debut for France in 2014.

Club career

Monaco

Kurzawa was born in Fréjus, France. He made his professional debut on 22 September 2010, soon after his 18th birthday, in a Coupe de la Ligue third round match against Lens at the Stade Louis II. He started the match and played 65 minutes before being substituted in a 1–0 victory. Three days later he made his Ligue 1 debut, starting in a 1–2 defeat at Lorient. Kurzawa played four more league matches, all of them starts, as the season ended with relegation to Ligue 2; he was sent off on 1 May 2011 in a 1–1 draw at Saint-Étienne. He made four appearances as they returned to the top flight at the first attempt as champions.

Kurzawa established himself in the first team for the 2013–14 season, with 28 league appearances as Monaco finished runner-up to Paris Saint-Germain. He also scored five goals, the first of his professional career confirming a 2–0 win at Guingamp on 14 December 2013.

He scored in each leg of Monaco's 7–1 aggregate win over Young Boys in the third qualifying round of the 2015–16 UEFA Champions League.

Paris Saint-Germain
On 27 August 2015, Kurzawa joined Ligue 1 champions Paris Saint-Germain for €23 million on a five-year contract. He made his debut on 11 September, coming on for Maxwell in the 67th minute of an eventual 2–2 draw with Bordeaux at the Parc des Princes. He scored his first goal for the team from the capital on 25 October, opening a 4–1 home win over Saint-Étienne when set up by Marco Verratti.

Kurzawa scored and assisted Javier Pastore on 6 August 2016 as PSG won the Trophée des Champions against Lyon with a 4–1 win in Klagenfurt, Austria. Six days later, he recorded the team's first league goal of the new season, the game's only against Bastia. On 8 March 2017, he scored an own goal in a 6–1 loss to Barcelona in the last 16 of the Champions League; as Unai Emery's team squandered a 4–0 advantage from the first leg.

On 31 October 2017, Kurzawa scored his first career hat-trick against Anderlecht in the Champions League group phase. Kurzawa became the first defender in modern Champions League history to achieve this feat in the competition.

On 29 June 2020, Kurzawa signed a four-year contract extension with Paris Saint-Germain. On 13 September 2020, Kurzawa was one of many players involved in a brawl in Le Classique, which resulted in five red cards. He was given a six match suspension for his actions.

Loan to Fulham
On 1 September 2022, Kurzawa joined Premier League side Fulham on a season-long loan. Kurzawa scored his first goal for Fulham on 7 January 2023 against Hull City in the FA Cup 3rd round.

International career
Kurzawa was born to a Guadeloupean father, and a Polish mother, and was approached to play for the Poland national team.

He was a French youth international and has earned caps with the under-19 team. On 14 October 2014, during the final leg of the 2015 UEFA European Under-21 Championship qualification play-offs against Sweden, Kurzawa celebrated a goal for France by mocking the Swedish players with a salute. Shortly after, Sweden scored a goal and won the game 4–1, thus eliminating France from the 2015 UEFA European Under-21 Championship.

On 14 November 2014, he made his full international debut, replacing Lucas Digne for the last 20 minutes of a 1–1 friendly draw with Albania in Rennes. Four days later, he made his first start, in a 1–0 friendly win over Sweden in Marseille, being substituted later on for Digne.

Kurzawa scored his first international goal on 1 September 2016, concluding a 3–1 friendly win over Italy at the Stadio San Nicola in Bari.

Career statistics

Club

International

France score listed first, score column indicates score after each Kurzawa goal

Honours
Monaco
 Ligue 2: 2012–13

Paris Saint-Germain
 Ligue 1: 2015–16, 2017–18, 2018–19, 2019–20
 Coupe de France: 2015–16, 2016–17, 2017–18, 2019–20; runner-up: 2018–19
 Coupe de la Ligue: 2015–16, 2016–17, 2017–18, 2019–20
 Trophée des Champions: 2016, 2017, 2018, 2019, 2020
UEFA Champions League runner-up: 2019–20
Individual
 Ligue 1 Team of the Year: 2013–14

References

External links

 
 
 

1992 births
Living people
Sportspeople from Fréjus
Footballers from Provence-Alpes-Côte d'Azur
French footballers
Association football defenders
ÉFC Fréjus Saint-Raphaël players
Pays d'Aix FC players
AS Monaco FC players
Paris Saint-Germain F.C. players
Fulham F.C. players
Championnat National 2 players
Ligue 1 players
Ligue 2 players
Premier League players
France youth international footballers
France under-21 international footballers
France international footballers
French expatriate footballers
Expatriate footballers in England
Expatriate footballers in Monaco
French expatriate sportspeople in England
French expatriate sportspeople in Monaco
Black French sportspeople
French people of Guadeloupean descent
French people of Polish descent